Eric Kinzner (born March 22, 2003) is an American soccer player who plays as a defender for USL Championship side Rio Grande Valley FC.

Career
Kinzner joined the Seattle Sounders FC academy from Federal Way FC in 2016. On July 13, 2020, Kinzner signed an academy contract with Seattle's USL Championship side Tacoma Defiance. After playing for both the Tacoma Defiance and on loan at FC Tucson, Kinzner joined Rio Grande Valley FC on January 20, 2023.

References

External links
 

Association football defenders
American soccer players
Tacoma Defiance players
FC Tucson players
Rio Grande Valley FC Toros players
USL Championship players
Soccer players from Tacoma, Washington
2003 births
Living people
United States men's youth international soccer players
USL League One players
MLS Next Pro players